Annandale is an unincorporated community and census-designated place (CDP) located within Clinton Township, in Hunterdon County, New Jersey, United States. As of the 2010 United States Census, the CDP's population was 1,695. The Annandale Historic District was listed on the state and national registers of historic places in 1994.

Geography
According to the United States Census Bureau, Annandale had a total area of 1.452 square miles (3.760 km2), all of which was land. It has a hot-summer humid continental climate (Dfa) and average monthly temperatures range from 28.2 °F in January to 72.9 °F in July.  The hardiness zone is 6b.

Demographics

Census 2010

Census 2000
As of the 2000 United States Census there were 1,276 people, 451 households, and 354 families living in the CDP. The population density was 339.8/km2 (880.0/mi2). There were 472 housing units at an average density of 125.7/km2 (325.5/mi2). The racial makeup of the CDP was 96.47% White, 0.63% African American, 2.19% Asian, 0.63% from other races, and 0.08% from two or more races. Hispanic or Latino of any race were 1.72% of the population.

There were 451 households, out of which 43.2% had children under the age of 18 living with them, 68.7% were married couples living together, 6.7% had a female householder with no husband present, and 21.5% were non-families. 16.4% of all households were made up of individuals, and 7.5% had someone living alone who was 65 years of age or older. The average household size was 2.83 and the average family size was 3.23.

In the CDP the population was spread out, with 29.0% under the age of 18, 4.7% from 18 to 24, 32.1% from 25 to 44, 25.7% from 45 to 64, and 8.5% who were 65 years of age or older. The median age was 38 years. For every 100 females, there were 96.9 males. For every 100 females age 18 and over, there were 97.4 males.

The median income for a household in the CDP was $80,738, and the median income for a family was $104,009. Males had a median income of $65,814 versus $37,171 for females. The per capita income for the CDP was $30,176. None of the families and 1.0% of the population were living below the poverty line, including no under eighteens and 8.0% of those over 64.

Historic district

The Annandale Historic District is a historic district encompassing the village of Annandale. The district was added to the National Register of Historic Places on September 8, 1994, for its significance in architecture, commerce, and industry from 1852 to 1930. It includes 191 contributing buildings.

Education
Immaculate Conception School (PreK-8) operates under the supervision of Roman Catholic Diocese of Metuchen.

Points of interest
 Jones Tavern, former recruiting station for the militia of Hunterdon County.

Gallery

Notable people

People who were born in, residents of, or otherwise closely associated with Annandale include:
 Matthew Acosta (born 2002), soccer player who plays as a midfielder for USL Championship club New York Red Bulls II.
 Walter Chandoha (1920–2019), animal photographer, known especially for his 90,000 photographs of cats.
 John B. Evans (1942-2004), publisher of The Village Voice.

In popular culture
According to the deed from "Previously On", the fictional town of Westview from WandaVision is coextensive with Annandale.

References

External links
 
 

Census-designated places in Hunterdon County, New Jersey
Clinton Township, New Jersey
National Register of Historic Places in Hunterdon County, New Jersey
Historic districts on the National Register of Historic Places in New Jersey
New Jersey Register of Historic Places